The Norwegian diaspora consists of Norwegian emigrants and their descendants, especially those that became Norwegian Americans. Emigrants also became  Norwegian Canadians, Norwegian Australians, Norwegian New Zealanders, Norwegian Brazilians,  Kola Norwegians and Norwegian South Africans.

History
Norsemen left the area that is now the modern state of Norway during the Viking Era expansion, with results including the settlement of Iceland and the conquest of Normandy.

In the 1500s and 1600s there was a small scattering of Norwegian people and culture as Norwegian tradesmen moved along the routes of the timber trade.

The 19th century wave of Norwegian emigration began in 1825. The Midwestern United States, especially the states of Wisconsin and Minnesota, was the destination of most people who left Norway. The first modern Norwegian-American settlement in  Minnesota was at Norwegian Ridge, in what is now Spring Grove, Minnesota.

Early emigrant communities in the United States were an enthusiastic market for books written in Norwegian principally from the 1890s to 1930s. Torbjørg Lie  (1855-1924), a  popular writer for the Decorah-Posten, imagined her readers "not so much adopting a new country as living in a diaspora." Meanwhile, newspapers in Norway were also eager to publish letters that recent emigrants had written home, telling of their experiences in foreign countries.

According to scholar Daniel Judah Elazar, "It was the Norwegian diaspora in the United States which initiated the separation of Norway from Sweden, which led to Norwegian independence in 1905." The Norwegian-American community overwhelmingly favored independence of Norway from Sweden, and collecting money for Norwegian rifle clubs in case the conflict should become violent. In 1884, the Minneapolis chapter of Den Norsk-Amerikanske Venstrefoening sent 4,000 kroners to Norway's Liberal Party (the party that favored independence.)  Norwegian-Americans campaigned enthusiastically for the United States to recognize Norway's independence from Sweden, with petitions and letters arriving in Washington, D.C. from most major cities. One petition from Chicago's Norwegian-American community bore 20,000 signatures. President Theodore Roosevelt did not change his stance, however, and remained neutral until after Sweden accepted the change.

As of 2006 there are over 5,000,000 Norwegian Americans.   In Canada in a 2006 survey, 432,515 Canadians reported Norwegian ancestry. 55,475 Americans spoke Norwegian at home as of 2000, and the American Community Survey in 2005 showed that 39,524 people use the language at home.

Ties to the homeland

The Norwegian Emigrant Museum in Hamar, Norway is dedicated to "collecting, preserving and disseminating knowledge about Norwegian emigration, and to the preservation of cultural ties between Norway and those of Norwegian ancestry throughout the world," according to the museum's website, which states that a million Norwegians emigrated to other countries around the world between 1825 and 2000.

The Sons of Norway, originally a small fraternal benefit organization, now has more than 60,000 members in America and almost 3,000 in Canada. It is dedicated to promoting Norwegian culture and traditions.

The Vesterheim Norwegian-American Museum in Decorah, Iowa, is the oldest and most comprehensive museum in the United States devoted to a single immigrant ethnic group.  It was founded in 1877 in association with nearby Luther College and re-dedicated in 1975 in a ceremony involving King Olav V of Norway. King Harald V of Norway was present in October 2012 for the celebration of Luther College's sequicentennial.

Self-identified Norwegians, whether in Norway or elsewhere, celebrate "Syttende Mai" on May 17  as Norwegian Constitution Day. They may hold a children's parade, wear traditional clothing, or  display ribbons of red, white, and blue. Norwegians in Sweden maintain their own Norwegian band "Det Norske Korps" for these celebrations.

Members of the Norwegian emigrant community in the United States took a special pride in Norway hosting the 1994 Winter Olympics in Lillehammer.

Sweden

Norwegians of Sweden include people who are registered in Sweden and who originate in Norway. According to Statistics Sweden, in 2018 in Sweden there were a total of approximately 41,700 people born in Norway. In 2019, there were a total of 111,734 people living in Sweden who were either born in Norway themselves or had at least one parent who was. The population in Sweden is 45,250 of which 41,747 were born in Norway and 3,503 were born in Sweden but with both parents born in Norway. There are 5 municipalities with the largest number of people born in Norway. There have been Norwegians in Sweden for centuries, and the Norwegian-Swedish state border has historically been crossed in connection with marriages and work migrations. During World War II, about 60,000 Norwegians sought refuge in Sweden, many of them young men who then sought refuge in Britain to take part in the Norwegian resistance movement against Germany's occupation of Norway. Swedish citizens of Norwegian descent live in Bohuslän, Idre, Särna, Jämtland, Härjedalen, Värmland, Västergötland, Dalsland, Brömsebro, Värmland, and other provinces that border Norway.

Denmark

Norwegians of Denmark are Danish citizens of Norwegian descent. A few Danes are believed to have participated with the Norwegians who moved west into the Atlantic Ocean, settling in the Shetland Isles, the Faroe Islands, Iceland, and Greenland. The Greenland Norse persisted from about 1000 AD to about 1450 AD. Seasonal trading camps have been recently discovered on Baffin Island containing European cordage, metal traces, masonry, and rat remains. Brief Viking expeditions to North America around 1000 did not result in any lasting settlements. Other Viking raids into Germany and the Mediterranean were short-lived and had no lasting effect. Some Danish Norwegians moved back to Norway. But others moved to Sweden, Finland, Russia, Estonia, United Kingdom, Iceland, Senegal, Germany, Poland, Lithuania, Latvia, and others in Northern Europe. Now, Norwegians in Denmark live in Hovedstaden, Mid Jutland, Northern Jutland, Faroe Islands, Iceland, Mosquito Bay in Greenland, Kungsbacka, Varberg and Falkenberg.

See also
Sons of Norway
List of US Communities where Norwegian is spoken
Norse colonization of the Americas
Scandinavian migration to the United Kingdom
Scandinavian diaspora

References

 
European diasporas